Zorawar Singh (17 November 1696 – 5 or 6 December 1705), alternatively spelt as Jorawar Singh, was a son of Guru Gobind Singh who was executed in the court of Wazir Khan, the Mughal Governor of Sirhind.

Background 
In 1699, the Hindu Rajahs of the Shiwalik Hills, frustrated with increasing Sikh ascendancy in the region, requested aid from Aurangzeb; their combined forces took on the Khalsa, led by Gobind Singh, at Anandapur but was defeated. Another faceoff followed in the neighboring Nirmoh but ended in Sikh victory; there was probably another conflict in Anandapur (c. 1702) to the same outcome. In 1704, the Rajahs mounted a renewed offensive against Singh in Anandapur but facing imminent defeat, requested aid from Aurangzeb. While the Mughal subahdars came to aid, they failed to change the course of the battle. Accordingly, the Rajahs decided to lay siege to the town than engage in open warfare.

With the passage of a few uneventful months, as scarcity of food set in, Singh's men compelled him to migrate; the besiegers guaranteed a safe passage but Singh did not trust them. The Sikhs left Anandapur in night and took refuge in Chamkaur, only for its Hindu Zamindar to inform the Rajahs and Mughal authority. In the melee that ensued, Singh escaped but most of his men were either killed or captured.

Death 
Some Sikh accounts note Singh's two younger sons — Zorowar Singh and Fateh Singh — to have successfully fought at Chamkaur before being captured. Other accounts note that they along with their grandmother had bee separated from the Sikh retinue while migrating away from Anandapur; subsequently, they were betrayed by local officials and handed over to the Mughals. Sukha Singh and Ratan Singh Bhangu, in particular, blames a greedy Brahmin for the betrayal.

The sons were taken to Sirhind and coerced for conversion to Islam in the court of Wazir Khan, the provincial governor. Sikh accounts accuse Sucha Nand, the Hindu Diwan, to have been the most vocal adocate for executing the children; Sher Muhammad Khan, the Nawab of Meherkotla, despite being an ally of the Mughals and losing relatives in the faceoff, was the sole dissenter. Both of the children maintained a steadfast refusal to convert and were executed. In early Sikh accounts, they were simply beheaded; in popular Sikh tradition, they are held to have been "bricked" (entombed) alive.

Gallery

See also 

 Ajit Singh
 Jujhar Singh
 Fateh Singh
 Martyrdom in Sikhism

References 

Sikh martyrs
Family members of the Sikh gurus
History of Punjab
People executed for refusing to convert to Islam
Executed Indian people
People executed by the Mughal Empire
Executed children
18th-century executions in India
Punjabi people
1696 births
1705 deaths